The People's Empowerment Party is a political party in Trinidad and Tobago. It contested the 2000 general elections, but received just 0.3% of the vote and failed to win a seat. The party did not contest any further national elections, but did run in elections in Tobago. In the 2001 Tobago House of Assembly elections it won 7.1% of the vote, but again failed to win a seat.

The party has not been dissolved, but has not had any significant activity in elections since 2001.

References

Defunct political parties in Trinidad and Tobago